The Cohoes-class net laying ships consisted of fifteen steel hull ships built near the end of World War II for the United States Navy, the last being commissioned shortly after war's end. They were similar in appearance and construction to the predecessor Aloe class, with slight differences in dimensions and displacement. Unlike previous net-laying classes, names were taken from a variety of place names, rather than from plants. All but two were decommissioned and put into reserve by the end of 1947, but most were reactivated at various times in the early 1950s and remained active until the early 1960s, when seven were transferred through lease or sale to several foreign navies. Two were transferred to other federal agencies; two were reactivated in the late 1960s and these served into the 1970s. Some of those transferred abroad were still active as late as 2007; none were lost in action.

Class members

References 

Auxiliary gateship classes
Auxiliary ship classes of the United States Navy